Pithodia tessellata is a species of beetle in the family Cerambycidae, and the only species in the genus Pithodia. It was described by Pascoe in 1865.

References

Apomecynini
Beetles described in 1865
Monotypic beetle genera